Ludwig Zinovievich Slonimsky (1 November 1849 —1918) was a Warsaw-born Jewish Russian journalist, publicist, economist and lawyer, the son of Hebrew scientist and publisher Hayyim Selig Slonimski.

Career
A Kiev University alumnus, Slonimsky started publishing articles on law and jurisprudence in Sudebny Vestnik (Court Herald) in Saint Petersburg in 1872. From 1875 to 1879 he was the head of the Foreign Policy section in Russkiy Mir, and for some time co-edited it with Yevgeny Rapp. After a short stint with the Slovo magazine, in 1881 he joined the newspaper Poryadok (Order), then succeeded Valentin Korsh as its Foreign Policies editor. In late 1882 Slonimsky became a member of the Severny Vestnik staff where his essays on economics soon started to appear regularly; in 1883 he became the head of this magazine's Foreign Review section.

Slonimsky lectured at the St Petersburg Juridical Society. He criticized Russia's financial policy, Marxist economics, and opposed the narodniks, while supporting obshchina. Among the issues he returned regularly to, were the theory of progress, usury, the rights of mentally ill patients, the legal rights of Jews in Russia and Leo Tolstoy's philosophy. He published numerous historical essays too, including those on Napoleon I, Oliver Cromwell, Alexander I and Nicholas I. Later in his life he co-edited (with Viktor Fausek) the Brockhaus and Efron Encyclopedic Dictionary.

References 

Russian journalists
Historians from the Russian Empire
Editors from the Russian Empire
Russian male essayists
Journalists from Warsaw
1849 births
1918 deaths